Livio Fongaro (January 2, 1931 in Valdagno – July 11, 2007 in Valdagno) was an Italian professional football player and coach.

External links

References

1931 births
2007 deaths
Italian footballers
Serie A players
Serie B players
Inter Milan players
Genoa C.F.C. players
Italian football managers
Genoa C.F.C. managers
Association football defenders